{| class="infobox" style="width: 30em; text-align: left; font-size: 90%; vertical-align: middle;"
|+ List of songs recorded by Bombay Jayashri
|-
| colspan="2" style="text-align:center;" | 
|-  style="background:#d9e8ff;"
!style="vertical-align: middle;"| Category
|  style="background;text-align:center; font-size:8pt; width:60px;"| Songs
|- style="background:#ddf;text-align:center;"
| style="text-align:center;"|
 Tamil Film Songs
|  
|- style="background:#ddf;text-align:center;"
| style="text-align:center;"|
 Telugu Film Songs
|
|- style="background:#ddf;text-align:center;"
| style="text-align:center;"|
 Malayalam Film Songs
|
|- style="background:#ddf;text-align:center;"
| style="text-align:center;"|
 Kannada Film Songs
|
|- style="background:#ddf;text-align:center;"
| style="text-align:center;"|
 Hindi Film Songs
|
|-
| colspan="2" style="text-align:center;" |
|-
| Total
| colspan="2" width=50 
|}

The following is the list of songs recorded by the popular carnatic vocalist Bombay Jayashri in Tamil, Telugu, Kannada, Malayalam and Hindi movies.
Jayashri has sung several film songs for movies under music directors like M. S. Viswanathan, Ilayaraja, A. R. Rahman, Yuvan shankar raja, Harris Jayaraj, Dhina, M. M. Keeravani, Shankar–Ehsaan–Loy, R. P. Patnaik, Hariharan – Lesle Lewis, D. Imman and Srikanth Deva. She shot to fame after singing the classical duet song "Narumugaiye" for the film Iruvar along with Unni Krishnan and composed by A. R. Rahman. Her other playback career highlighting song was "Vaseegara" for the film Minnale in 2001, composed by Harris Jayaraj. This song was sung again by herself in the Telugu version of the film (Cheli) also. She had given many hit songs with Harris Jayaraj in various languages. She has a mesmerising voice which makes all class of listeners to pay attention on her songs. She has rendered her voice to popular actresses like Jyothika, Tabu, Asin, Divya Spandana, Rakshitha, Reema Sen, Madhoo, Karthika, Suhasini, Meera Jasmine, Kajal Agarwal, Kamalini Mukherjee, Sneha, Charmi, Nayanthara, Poornima Bhagyaraj and Silk Smitha.

Film discography

Tamil songs
She has worked with the music Maestro M.S. Viswanathan in a devotional album called "Arul tharum Abirami".

1980s

1990s

2000s

2010s

2020s

Telugu songs

Kannada Songs

Malayalam Songs

Hindi songs

References

External links
 
 Singer & Composer | Bombay Jayashri

Jayashri, Bombay